The Manuel Rojas Ibero-American Narrative Award is an annual award given in honor of the author of Hijo de ladrón by the National Council of Culture and the Arts of Chile.

It was instituted in 2012 with the sponsorship of the Manuel Rojas Foundation and was delivered for the first time that year, on the centenary of the writer's foot crossing from Argentina, "at which time he began his vast literary career," as pointed out on the occasion by Jorge Guerra, president of the foundation. The winner is chosen by an international jury composed of five literary figures – two Chileans and three foreigners.

Winners

References

External links
 Manuel Rojas Foundation

2012 establishments in Chile
Awards established in 2012
Chilean literary awards